Jeffrey Michael Traylor (born May 9, 1968) is an American football coach. He is the head football coach at the University of Texas at San Antonio (UTSA), a position he has held since the 2020 season.

Early life
Traylor attended Gilmer High School and graduated in 1986. He attended Stephen F. Austin State University, where he was a walk-on for the Lumberjacks football program. He earned both his undergraduate (1990) and graduate (2002) degrees in education.

Career

High school
Traylor began his coaching career at Big Sandy High School, where he spent four years as an assistant coach from 1989 to 1992. He was later hired as an assistant coach at Jacksonville High School from 1993 to 1999, where he served as passing coordinator, defensive backs coach, receivers coach and special teams coordinator. There, he helped coach future NFL quarterbacks Josh McCown and Luke McCown and former Texas A&M standout signal-caller Randy McCown.

Traylor then coached at Gilmer High School where he was named four-time Texas High School Coach of the Year for Class 4A, and posted a 175-26 record (.871 winning percentage). During his 15-year tenure, Traylor led the Buckeyes to appearances in five state championship game (2004, 2007, 2009, 2012, and 2014), winning three state titles (2004, 2009, and 2014) and 12 district crowns. In 2015, Gilmer renamed Buckeye Stadium to Jeff Traylor Stadium to honor Traylor's success. At Gilmer, Traylor coached future NFL players Kenneth Pettway, Manuel Johnson, Curtis Brown, David Snow, G. J. Kinne, Gus Johnson, Blake Lynch, and Kris Boyd.

Texas
Traylor began his collegiate career in 2015 at the University of Texas at Austin as the special teams coordinator and tight ends coach under Charlie Strong before becoming the Longhorns associate head coach for offense and wide receivers coach in 2016. While with the Texas Longhorns football program Traylor helped sign the No. 7-ranked recruiting class in the country in back-to-back years and was named Big 12 Recruiter of the Year.

SMU
In 2017, Traylor became the associate head coach and running backs coach for Southern Methodist University before joining the Arkansas Razorbacks in the same role. Both of these jobs were under coach Chad Morris who had also previously been a Texas high school coach.

Arkansas
For the 2018 and 2019 football seasons, Traylor served as the associate head coach and running back coach at the University of Arkansas under head coach Chad Morris.

UTSA
In December 2019, Traylor left the Arkansas Razorbacks football program to become the third head coach in program history at UTSA. He tested positive for COVID-19 on December 23, 2020, and missed the 2020 First Responder Bowl as a result. In 2021, Traylor led the Roadrunners to their best start in program history for a season, winning their first eleven regular season games before finishing the regular season 11-1. The UTSA Roadrunners also secured their first conference championship, defeating Western Kentucky 49-41, followed by a bowl bid to the 2021 Frisco Bowl, losing to San Diego State University by a score of 38-24 and a final record of the year of 12-2.

Head coaching record

College

 Prior to the 2020 First Responder Bowl, Jeff Traylor tested positive for COVID-19. Associate head coach Barry Lunney Jr. was UTSA's acting head coach for the game.

Personal life 
Traylor married his wife, Cari, in 1992. They have three children: Jordan, Jake, and Jaci. Jordan played as a quarterback for Gilmer High School and the Texas A&M Aggies, and is currently a defensive assistant for the New Orleans Saints.

References

External links
 UTSA profile
 Arkansas profile
 Texas profile

1968 births
Living people
Arkansas Razorbacks football coaches
SMU Mustangs football coaches
Stephen F. Austin Lumberjacks football players
Texas Longhorns football coaches
UTSA Roadrunners football coaches
High school football coaches in Texas
People from Gilmer, Texas
Coaches of American football from Texas
Players of American football from Texas